is a female volleyball player from Japan. Tsutsui plays for Le Cannet (fr) and also plays for the Japan women's national volleyball team as libero.

Career 
Tsutsui was born in Kurate Town, Fukuoka Prefecture. She became a volleyball player at 6 years old and won a silver medal at All-Japan elementary school's tournament with Kurate junior VC.

While attending the Higashikyushu Ryukoku Highschool, Tsutsui won various highschool competitions with Miyu Nagaoka who is one year senior. Especially at 2009 Empress's Cup, Higashikyushu Ryukoku Highschool beat two teams of V.Premier League and Tsutsui won the bronze medal.

On 20 December 2010 Hisamitsu Springs announced her joining next season.

In 2013-14 V.Premier League Tsutsui played as regular libero and won the Best Libero Awards.

Once Tsutsui said "I want to play for the national team someday", which she did. Tsutsui competed at 2014 Montreux Volley Masters and won the silver medal at 2014 FIVB World Grand Prix.

On 3 August 2015 the French volleyball team Le Cannet (fr) announced her joining.

Clubs 
  Kurate junior volleyball club
  Hakata Girls' Junior High (2005-)
  HIgashikyushu Ryukoku High (2008-)
  Hisamitsu Springs (2011-2015)
  Le Cannet(fr)

Awards

Individuals
 2013-14 V.Premier League - Best Libero award

Team
 2011-2012 V.Premier League -  Runner-Up, with Hisamitsu Springs.
 2012 Empress's Cup -  Champion, with Hisamitsu Springs.
 2012-2013 V.Premier League -  Champion, with Hisamitsu Springs.
 2013 - Japan-Korea V.League Top Match -  Champion, with Hisamitsu Springs.
 2013 - Kurowashiki All Japan Volleyball Tournament -  Champion, with Hisamitsu Springs.
 2013 - Empress's Cup -  Champion, with Hisamitsu Springs.
 2013-2014 V.Premier League -  Champion, with Hisamitsu Springs.
 2014 Asian Club Championship -  Champion, with Hisamitsu Springs.

National team
 2014 FIVB World Grand Prix -  Silver medal

References

External links 
 FIVB - Biography
 JVA - 2014 Team Roster
 V.League - Biography
 Hisamitsu Springs - Biography

Japanese women's volleyball players
Living people
1992 births